Télétoon (styled as TĒLĒTOON) is a Canadian French language specialty channel owned by Teletoon Canada, Inc., a subsidiary of Corus Entertainment. Its name is a portmanteau of "télévision" and "cartoon". As of 2013, along with its English language counterpart Teletoon, it is available in over 7.3 million Canadian households.

History
It was licensed in 1996 by the Canadian Radio-television and Telecommunications Commission (CRTC). The French-language channel was the first to be launched, on September 8, 1997. It used the slogan  ('The Animation Station', the same as that of the contemporaneous English-language channel), and later added and then switched to Imagine!.

When Télétoon was launched in 1997, it showed more mature fare as the day progressed, with a strong commitment to air diverse and international programming, and the ability to air a great majority of material uncut. A typical broadcast day started with preschool content at 7:00 a.m. EST and ended with adult content after midnight, airing more adult cartoons such as Duckman and various anime programs.

In 1999, Télétoon started airing bumpers with its first mascot, Teletina. These bumpers were made by Spin Productions in Toronto. Several more bumpers using CGI animation with some made by Guru Studio premiered on the channel in 2001. An updated look for the channel, no longer featuring the original logo, was later created for a partial rebranding in 2005. The bumpers were removed in 2007 as part of an on-air rebranding.

On February 5, 2007, Télétoon's on-air appearance and website were dramatically changed, and Le Détour's website was moved to teletoon.com. The look of the channel and the Le Détour block changed. In 2010, Télétoon starting using parodied Roblox figures, blocks, and backgrounds called "Toonmix’". This bumpers were created using Blender 3D. Variants to the bumpers were reduced. Instead, they are speech bubble onscreen graphics telling viewers which shows are coming up next, and used in the "up next" bumper.

On September 5, 2011, Télétoon's branding was changed to coincide with the 50th anniversary of co-owner Astral Media and to reflect the transition from analogue to digital television. Télétoon la Nuit's on-air branding was not changed until 2020.

In August 2015, it was announced that Télétoon Rétro would be shutting down, and some series would be moving to Télétoon on September 1.

Changes in ownership
When launched, the channel was owned by a consortium made up of various other Canadian specialty services and producers; Family Channel acting as managing partner at 53.3% (in a partnership between Astral Media and Western International Communications), YTV at 26.7% (under Shaw Communications), and Cinar and Nelvana with 10% each.

Changes of ownership have occurred since 1999, starting when Corus Entertainment was spun off from Shaw Communications (who had owned a stake of Télétoon through YTV) in 1999. In 2000, Western International Communications (who owned a stake of Télétoon through the Family Channel alongside Astral Media) sold its stake of Télétoon to Corus Entertainment. Corus, in the same year, acquired Nelvana, another company who owned a stake of Télétoon. Due to a complaint from the CRTC, Corus sold the stake to Astral Media in 2001. Through various acquisitions over the years, Cinar Films came to own a 20% stake, and Astral Media and Corus Entertainment each owned a 40% stake. In 2006, Cinar sold 10% of its stake of Teletoon to each of Astral and Corus, leading the two companies to each own 50% in Télétoon.

On March 4, 2013, Corus Entertainment announced that it would acquire Astral Media's 50% ownership interest in Teletoon Canada (owner of Teletoon, Télétoon, Teletoon Retro, Télétoon Rétro and Cartoon Network). The purchase was in relation to Bell Media's pending takeover of Astral. The takeover had been rejected by the CRTC in October 2012, but was restructured to allow the sale of certain Astral Media properties so that the purchase could clear regulatory barriers. Bell filed a new application for the proposed takeover with the CRTC on March 6, 2013. Corus's purchase was cleared by the Competition Bureau on March 18; the CRTC approved the Bell-Astral merger on June 27, 2013. On December 20, 2013, the CRTC approved Corus's full ownership of Teletoon Canada and it was purchased by Corus on January 1, 2014. The channel continues to be owned by Teletoon Canada, now wholly owned by Corus Entertainment under its Corus Kids and Corus Média divisions.

Programming
Many of the shows broadcast on Télétoon are those shown on its English-language counterpart dubbed into French. At first, both networks had identical schedules, airing the same episode of the same program at the same time. Nowadays, the schedules sometimes differ, because Télétoon carries some translated programs that its English-language counterpart does not, as they are aired on other cable networks. Many of the shows, such as The Simpsons and King of the Hill, are dubbed using domestic Québécois voice-over actors, while others, such as Naruto and virtually all series originating from Cartoon Network, utilize dubs mainly meant for audiences in Metropolitan France.

Original series
At its inception in 1997, the channel had a stated goal of producing 78 half-hours of original content every year, and it has been active in commissioning programming since then. The licence granted by the Canadian Radio-television and Telecommunications Commission (CRTC) in 1996 required a gradual increase in the portion of Canadian programming on the schedule by about five percent each year starting from 40% in its first year of operation to 60% by 2002. In 1998, network management decided to focus on renewals instead of new shows – adopting a more cautious strategy than launching a significant number of new series, as it had in the prior year. By 2001, however, the station was noted as possibly being the Canadian channel with the highest spending on original production, having invested in 98 series, including 225 half-hour episodes that fall season.

Variant

As a bilingual service, Teletoon/Télétoon maintains two separate broadcast feeds, with a single licence for the English- and French-language channels. It is one of only two Canadian specialty services with such a licence. At the original licensing hearing before the CRTC, the network's operators had stated that the two channels "would be similar in nature and programmed with a similar attitude towards them. But for the reasons of rights availability, for the reasons of the question of advertising to children in Québec and for the reason of dealing with the differences in the market, there might be variations in the services offered." To this end, the station implemented a requirement that all original programming be delivered in both languages. By 2007, however, this condition had been relaxed to apply "whenever possible", and over the following years some original series were only shown on one of the channels.

Current programming
As of March 2023:

6teen
Bakugan: Battle Planet
Beyblade Burst
Bravest Warriors
Cupcake et Dino: Services en tout genre (Cupcake and Dino: General Services)
DC Super Hero Girls
D.N. Ace
Douggy et Pony font leur show (The Dog and Pony Show) (G)
Garderie extrême (Total Dramarama)
Hôtel Transylvanie (Hotel Transylvania)
Il pleut des hamburgers (Cloudy with a Chance of Meatballs)
Jellystone!
Lego City Adventures
Lego Ninjago
La ligue des justiciers: Nouvelle génération (Young Justice)
Looney Tunes Cartoons
Mega Souhait (Super Wish)
Mon derrière perd la tête (The Day My Butt Went Psycho!)
Nouvelle Ligue des justiciers (Justice League Unlimited)
Ollie et le monstrosac (Ollie's Pack)
Pète le vœu (Wishfart)
Pokémon, la serie (Pokémon the Series)
La Retenue (Detentionaire)
Scooby-Doo et Compagnie (Scooby-Doo and Guess Who?) (G)
Les Simpson (The Simpsons) (13+)
Sourire d'enfer (Braceface)
Teen Titans Go!
Le Tom et Jerry Show (2014) (The Tom and Jerry Show (2014))

Former programming

Les 3 Amigonautes (3 Amigonauts)
3 et Moi (My Life Me)
Ace Ventura (Ace Ventura: Pet Detective)
Adventure Time avec Finn et Jake (Adventure Time)
Affreux Vilains Martiens (Butt-Ugly Martians) (8+)
Air Academy (Flight Squad)
Les Amis ratons (The Raccoons) (G)
Angela Anaconda (G)
Angry Birds Toons
Arc-en-ciel le plus beau poisson des océans (Rainbow Fish) (G)
Archie, Mystères et Compagnie (Archie's Weird Mysteries) (G)
Atomic Betty (G)
Atomic Puppet
Avengers: L'équipe des supers héros (The Avengers: Earth's Mightiest Heroes)
Avengers Rassemblement (Avengers Assemble)
Les aventures d'Ollivier (Olliver's Adventures) (G)
Les Aventures d'une mouche (Fly Tales) (G)
Les Aventures de l'Ours Paddington (The Adventures of Paddington Bear) (G)
Axel et les Power Players
Baby Looney Tunes (G)
Bagel et Becky (The Bagel and Becky Show)
Bakugan Battle Brawlers
Barbe-Rouge (Captain Red Beard)
Les Baskerville (The Baskervilles) (8+)
Batman (The Batman)
Batman (Batman: The Animated Series)
Batman : L'Alliance des héros (Batman: The Brave and the Bold)
Batman, la relève (Batman Beyond)
Battle B-Daman (B-Daman Crossfire)
Beetlejuice
Ben 10 (2005)
Ben 10 (2016)
Ben 10: Alien Force
Ben 10: Omniverse
Ben 10: Ultimate Alien
Bric-a-Brac
2 Stupid Dogs (G)
Bêtes à craquer (Animal Crackers)
Beyblade
Beyblade: Metal Fusion
Billy the Cat, dans la peau d'un chat (Billy the Cat) (G)
Billy et Mandy, aventuriers de l'au-delà (The Grim Adventures of Billy & Mandy) (13+)
Bip Bip et Coyote (The Road Runner Show) (G)
Bizzareville (Freaktown)
Blaise le blasé (Fred's Head)
Blake et Mortimer (Blake and Mortimer)
Bob Et Scott (Bob And Scott) (G)
Boni
La Boucle (Looped)
Bratz
Bugs Bunny et Tweety (The Bugs Bunny & Tweety Show) (G)
Bugs et les Looney Tunes (New Looney Tunes)
Bunnicula
Le Bus magique (The Magic School Bus) (G)
Ça passe ou ça casse (Hole in the Wall)
Cadillacs et Dinosaures (Cadillacs and Dinosaurs)
Caillou (G)
Camp Lazlo (G)
Camp Marécage (Camp Lakebottom)
Capitaine Star (Captain Star) (G)
Carl au carré (Carl²) (G)
Carrément chat (Counterfeit Cat)
Ce Cher Ed (Best Ed)
Chaotic
Chop Chop Ninja
Chop Chop Ninja Challenge
Chop Socky Chooks
Chowder
Les Chroniques de Matt Hatter (Matt Hatter Chronicles)
La Classe en Délire (The Kids from Room 402) (G)
Classe des Titans (Class of the Titans) (8+)
Cléo et Chico (Cow and Chicken) (G)
Colis de la Planète X (Packages from Planet X)
Collège Rhino Véloce (Flying Rhino Junior High) (G)
Courage, le chien froussard (Courage the Cowardly Dog) (8+)
Cracké (Cracked)
Creepschool (8+)
Crypte Show (Tales from the Cryptkeeper) (8+)
Cybersix (13+)
Défis extrêmes (Total Drama)
Défis extrêmes : L'absurdicourse (Total Drama Presents the Ridiculous Race)
Delilah et Julius (Delilah & Julius)
Di-Gata les défenseurs (Di-Gata Defenders) (8+)
Digimon
Dilbert (13+)
Dinofroz
Donkey Kong (G)
Dr. Pantastique (Dr. Dimensionpants)
DreamWorks Dragons
Drôles de colocs (Endangered Species)
Drôle de voyou (Bad Dog) (G)
Duck Dodgers (G)
Eckhart (G)
Ed, Edd et Eddy (Ed, Edd & Eddy) (G)
Édouard (Edward) (G)
Edouard et Martin (Marvin the Tap-Dancing Horse) (G)
Matt et les Monstres (Matt's Monsters)
Les Enquêtes de Miss Mallard (A Miss Mallard Mystery) (G)
Épopée vers l'Ouest - La Légende du singe roi (Journey to the West – Legends of the Monkey King)
Les Exploits d'Arsène Lupin (Night Hood)
Fifi Brindacier (Pippi Longstocking) (G)
Foster, la maison des amis imaginaires (Foster's Home for Imaginary Friends) (G)
Les Fous du volant (1968) (Wacky Races (1968)) (G)
Les Fous du volant (2017) (Wacky Races (2017))
Frankie et les ZhuZhu Pets (The ZhuZhus)
Fred des Cavernes (Fred the Caveman) (G)
Les Fungies (The Fungies!)
Fusée XL5 (Fireball XL5)
Le futur est .... wow ! (The Future is Wild)
Futz! (G)
GeoFreakZ
George de la jungle (George of the Jungle) (G)
Gerald McBoing-Boing (G)
Gormiti (2018)
Grabujband (Grojband)
Les Graffitos (Stickin' Around)
Green Lantern
Gribouille (Doodlez) (G)
Hamtaro (2002) (G)
Harry et ses dinosaures (Harry and His Bucket Full of Dinosaurs) (G)
L'Heure de la terreur (R.L. Stine's The Haunting Hour)
Hot Wheels Battle Force 5
Hulk et les agents du S.M.A.S.H (Hulk and the Agents of S.M.A.S.H.)
Iggy Arbuckle (G)
Inspecteur Gadget (2015) (Inspector Gadget (2015))
Iron Man: Armored Adventures
Ivanhoé
Les Jetson (The Jetsons) (G)
Jimmy délire (Out of Jimmy's Head)
Jimmy l'Intrépide (Jimmy Two-Shoes)
Johnny Bravo
Johnny Test
Les Jumeaux Zimmer (The Zimmer Twins)
Juniper Lee (The Life and Times of Juniper Lee)
Kappa Mikey
Kaput et Zösky (Kaput and Zösky)
Kid Paddle (8+)
Le Laboratoire de Dexter (Dexter's Laboratory) (G)
Le Lapinet Discret (Untalkative Bunny) (G)
Les Lapins Crétins Invasion (Rabbids Invasion)
La Légende de Calamity Jane (The Legend of Calamity Jane)
Legends of Chima
Lego Hero Factory
Lego Nexo Knights
La ligue des justiciers : Action (Justice League Action)
LoliRock
Looney Tunes
Ma gardienne est un vampire (My Babysitter's a Vampire)
Le Magicien d'Oz : Dorothy et ses amis (Dorothy and the Wizard of Oz)
Marguerite et la bête féroce (Maggie and the Ferocious Beast) (G)
Medabots
Méga Bébés (Mega Babies) (8+)
MegaMan NT Warrior
Megas XLR (8+)
MetaJets
Mike, Lu et Og (Mike, Lu & Og) (G)
Les Mini-Tuques (Snowsnaps)
Minus et Cortex (Pinky and the Brain)
Mission Invisible (I.N.K. Invisible Network of Kids)
Miss Spider : La série animée (Miss Spider's Sunny Patch Friends) (G)
Moi Willy, fils de rock-star (My Dad the Rock Star) (G)
Mon copain de classe est un singe (My Gym Partner's a Monkey) (G)
Le Monde de Blaster (Blaster's Universe)
Le Monde de Quest (World of Quest)
Le Monde incroyable de Gumball (The Amazing World of Gumball)
Monsieur Belette (I Am Weasel)
Moumoute, un mouton dans la ville (Sheep in the Big City) (8+)
¡Mucha Lucha! (G)
Mudpit
Mysticons
Mythologies : les gardiens de la légende (Mythic Warriors: Guardians of the Legend)
Nanook (Nanook's Great Hunt)
Naruto (13+/18+)
Ned et son triton (Ned's Newt) (G)
Nom de code : Kids Next Door (Codename: Kids Next Door) (G)
Oh non ! Des aliens ! (Oh No! It's an Alien Invasion!)
Les Oursons Du Square Théodore (The Upstairs Downstairs Bears) (G)
Ozzy et Drix (Ozzy & Drix)
Patates et Dragons (Potatoes and Dragons) (G)
Patrouille 03 (Patrol 03) (8+)
Au pays des Têtes à claques (Knuckleheads) (16+)
Pecola (G)
La Petite Patrouille (Toad Patrol) (8+)
Les Pierrafeu (The Flintstones) (G)
Pingu (G)
Pirate Express
Pikwik Pack
Planète Sketch (Planet Sketch) (8+)
Poochini
Polly Pocket
PorCité (Pig City) (G)
Pour le meilleur et pour le pire (For Better or For Worse) (G)
Pourquoi pas Mimi ? (What About Mimi?) (G)
Power Rangers (8+)
Prenez garde à Batman ! (Beware the Batman)
Princesse Sissi (Princess Sissi) (G)
Quoi d'neuf, Scooby-Doo ? (What's New, Scooby-Doo?) (G)
Ratz (G)
Redakai, les conquerants du Kairu (Redakai: Conquer the Kairu)
Redwall (G)
Regular Show
Ren et Stimpy (The Ren & Stimpy Show) (13+)
Ricky Sprocket (Ricky Sprocket: Showbiz Boy) (G)
Rien Que Des Monstres (Nothing But Monsters)
Robin des Bois Junior (Young Robin Hood)
RoboBlatte (RoboRoach) (G)
Rocko et compagnie (Rocko's Modern Life)
Sabrina, la série animée (Sabrina: The Animated Series)
Sacré Andy ! (What's with Andy?) (G)
Sacrés Dragons (Blazing Dragons)
Sakura, chasseuse de cartes (Cardcaptors Sakura) 
Sam et Max : Privés de police!!! (The Adventures of Sam & Max: Freelance Police)
Samba et Leuk (Kassai and Luk)
Sammy et Scooby en folie (Shaggy & Scooby-Doo Get a Clue!)
Santo Bugito
Les Saturdays (The Secret Saturdays)
Les Sauveteurs du monde (Rescue Heroes) (G)
Scooby-Doo
Scooby-Doo! Mystère associés (Scooby-Doo! Mystery Incorporated)
Silverwing
Simon au pays des dessins à la craie (Simon in the Land of Chalk Drawings)
Les Singestronautes (Rocket Monkeys)
Skatoony
Sonic le Rebelle (Sonic Underground)
SOS Fantômes (The Real Ghostbusters)
Le Spectaculaire Spider-Man (The Spectacular Spider-Man)
Spider Riders (8+)
Spiez, nouvelle génération (The Amazing Spiez!) (G)
Splat!
Splatalot!
Star Wars: The Clone Wars
Starship Troopers
Stoked : Ça va surfer ! (Stoked)
The Super Hero Squad Show
Les Supers Nanas (The Powerpuff Girls) (G)
Supernoobs
Super Zéro (The Tick) (13+)
Le Surfer d'Argent (Silver Surfer) (13+)
Têtes à claques (16+)
Thundercats RRRR (Thundercats Roar)
Les Tiny Toons (Tiny Toon Adventures) (G)
Titi et Grominet mènent l'enquête (The Sylvester & Tweety Mysteries) (G)
Les Tofou (The Tofus) (G)
Tom et Jerry (Tom and Jerry)
Tom et Jerry Tales (Tom and Jerry Tales)
Tom et Jerry à New York (Tom and Jerry in New York)
ToonMarty
Les Tortues Ninja (2003) (Teenage Mutant Ninja Turtles (2003)) (8+)
Les Tortues Ninja (2012) (Teenage Mutant Ninja Turtles (2012))
Ted Sieger's Wildlife (1999) (G)
Totally Spies! (G)
Touftoufs et polluards (The Smoggies) (G)
Transformers: Animated
Transformers: Cybertron
Transformers: Cyberverse
Transformers: Energon
Les Trois Petites Sœurs (The Triplets) (G)
Trop cool, Scooby-Doo ! (Be Cool, Scooby-Doo!)
Unikitty!
Ultimate Spider-Man (13+)
Un écureuil chez moi (Squirrel Boy)
Un monstre en boîte (Monster in a Box)
Un trésor dans mon jardin (A Treasure in My Garden) (8+)
Va-t'en Licorne (Go Away, Unicorn!)
Votez Becky! (Majority Rules!)
W
Wally Gator
Wayside (G)
 W.I.T.C.H.
Wild C.A.T.s
Winston et Dudley Ding Dong (Winston Steinburger and Sir Dudley Ding Dong)
Wolverine et les X-Men (Wolverine and the X-Men)
X-Men (13+)
Yabba-Dabba Dinosaures (Yabba-Dabba Dinosaurs)
Yakkity Yak
Yogi et ses amis (The Yogi Bear Show)
Yoko! Jakamoko! Toto!
Yo-kai Watch
Yu-Gi-Oh! Arc-V
ZeromanZig et Sharko (Zig and Sharko)Les Zinzins de l'espace (Space Goofs)Les Zybrides (Spliced)

Programming blocks

Current
  –  is a Saturday morning programming block from 7 a.m. to 12 p.m.
  –  is a block on Saturdays at 4 p.m. and Sundays at 10 a.m. ET, that mostly airs animated movies (such as Tom and Jerry: The Movie, The Powerpuff Girls Movie and Looney Tunes movies, among others). It also airs live action movies such as the first Teenage Mutant Ninja Turtles movie.
 Télétoon la nuit – animated programming targeted towards teen and adult audiences airs during the nighttime hours as part of the programming block  (formerly , then ), the French version of the now-defunct Teletoon at Night (formerly ), which is similar in format to Cartoon Network's Adult Swim.  starts at 8 p.m.

Yearly
  – the  block replaces morning programming during the summer vacation period from July to August, containing some of the channel's popular programs, and daily movies. However, in the summer of 2009,  was placed on hiatus, with  taking its place. The block returned in the summer of 2012, now airing weeknights from 9:00 to 12:00 a.m. ET.
  – this block features holiday specials.

Former
 Original blocks – in 1997, Télétoon chose a different style of animation for each block. Each blocks were represented as planets: Claymation for Pre-School (4 a.m. to 3 p.m.), Cel animation for Kids (3 p.m. to 6 p.m.), Collage for Family (6 p.m. to 9 p.m.) and Paper mache for Adult (9 p.m. to 4 a.m.). Each block's bumpers were made by Cuppa Coffee Studios.
  – launched in 2000, Télétoon Dechaine! is an adult-oriented block of the channel (the french version of Teletoon Unleashed!); it co-existed with Le Détour sur Télétoon until the block merged with it in 2004. It was known for airing every show with an 18+ rating to attract an adult audience, regardless of whether the program actually contained adults-only material or not. It was discontinued in 2004 due to lack of new content, since 90% of the material were shows with a limited amount of episodes, leading to frequent rerun. It was also found that Le Detour sur Télétoon and Dechaine! attracted a similar mixed audience of teens and adults, hence the amalgamation.
 Télétoon Kapow! – Launched in September 2003, Kapow! was an action block, which featured the shows Teenage Mutant Ninja Turtles, Spider Riders, MegaMan NT Warrior and The Batman. Kapow! was usually shown on weekend mornings in large blocks, although it did air in smaller blocks during the weekdays.  Teletoon Kapow! was used as the name of the Canadian Cartoon Network channel license.
  –  was created on September 3, 2007 and air every weekday from 4:00 to 6:00 p.m. with different shows every day. Throughout the week, viewers could vote online on the Télétoon website to pick one show that would air during the  block. Once a month, five viewers each got to choose the shows for an entire weekday afternoon.
  – the  block aired weekday mornings from 7:00 to 9:00 a.m. ET and on Saturday mornings. It aired shows such as Out of Jimmy's Head, Chowder, and Jimmy Two-Shoes.
  – the  block aired on Monday through Thursdays and Sunday from 6:00 to 9:00 p.m. ET. On Thursdays, it was called , and it aired new episodes of The Simpsons, Johnny Test, Jimmy Two-Shoes, Stoked, Total Drama, Majority Rules! and 6teen.
 Télétoon Rétro –  was the brand for Télétoon's blocks of classic animated programming. In Fall 2008, a digital channel under the same name was launched, featuring classic animated programs.
 Mission:Action – The Mission:Action block aired on weekdays starting at 4:00 p.m. ET, and on Sunday mornings/afternoons. It featured action series such as The Secret Saturdays, Bakugan Battle Brawlers, Chop Socky Chooks, Batman: The Brave and the Bold, Naruto, Wolverine and the X-Men, Johnny Test, Iron Man: Armored Adventures, Chaotic, Totally Spies!, The Super Hero Squad Show and The Spectacular Spider-Man. New additions included Power Rangers Samurai, The Avengers: Earth's Mightiest Heroes, Hot Wheels Battle Force 5, The Amazing Spiez!, Star Wars: The Clone Wars and Bakugan: Gundalian Invaders.
 Télétoon Jr. - The Télétoon Jr. block aired weekdays starting at 9:00 a.m. ET. A video-on-demand channel also exist which run a different set of series than those featured on the block.
  –  is a programming block airing on Thursday evenings from 6 to 9 p.m. ET.
  –  is an action-oriented programming block airing Friday evenings from 6:30 to 9 p.m. ET.

Related services

Télétoon Sur Demande
 is a video on demand channel featuring series from Télétoon.

English services

Teletoon and Cartoon Network are the English counterpart and sister channel to Télétoon, respectively. They broadcast most of the shows from its French-language counterpart in English.

Télétoon HD
On March 24, 2014, Télétoon launched a high definition feed called Télétoon HD, which simulcasts the standard definition feed. The channel is available on Cogeco, then on Vidéotron and Bell Fibe TV.

Former
Télétoon Jr. Sur Demande
 was a video on demand multiplex channel and was named after a program block featuring animated series aimed at younger children's; shows included on the  channel have included such shows as Caillou, Atomic Betty, George of the Jungle, The Future is Wild, and Bobby's World. The service was discontinued some time in 2018.

Télétoon Rétro

 was a Category B digital cable and satellite channel that debuted on September 4, 2008. It was named after a program block featuring classic animated series.  channel's programs have included The Tom and Jerry Show, The Bugs Bunny & Tweety Show, Scooby-Doo, The Flintstones, The Raccoons, The Jetsons, Astro Boy, and Fat Albert and the Cosby Kids''. The channel closed on September 1, 2015 and was replaced by La Chaîne Disney.

References

External links
 
 Télétoon la Nuit 
 Télétoon logo

 
Analog cable television networks in Canada
Corus Entertainment
Television channels and stations established in 1997
1997 establishments in Canada
French-language television networks in Canada
Children's television networks in Canada

hy:Télétoon